Sir Timothy Tyrrell (also spelled Tirrell; –1632) was an Englishman who served as Master of the Buckhounds to Henry Frederick, Prince of Wales and King Charles I.

Family

Tyrrell was born in Oakley, Buckinghamshire, the son of Sir Edward Tyrrell, Member of Parliament for Buckingham, by his second wife, Margaret. He was the brother of politician and judge Thomas Tyrrell.

He married Eleanor Kingsmill, daughter of Sir William Kingsmill (died 1618) of Sydmonton and Anne Wilkes, on 22 August 1613 in Marsworth, Buckinghamshire. They had seven children:

Sir Timothy Tyrrell (1617–1701), also Master of the Hounds to King Charles
William, killed in the English Civil War at the Siege of Chester in 1644
Henry, ranger of Whaddon Chase
Charles, died unmarried, 1694
Eleanor, married first to Sir Peter Temple; secondly to Richard Grenville of Wotton, with whom she had Richard Grenville, M.P.
Bridget, died unmarried
Mary, married to Sir Walter Pye

Shotover Park

Tyrrell was granted the rangership of Shotover Forest after a freak hunting accident early in the 17th century, in which he was maimed by the teenaged Henry, Prince of Wales, eldest son of King James I. According to a chronicle of the unfortunate accident:

In 1613, following Prince Henry's death in 1612, King James confirmed the rangership of Shotover by letters patent for the duration of the lives of Timothy Tyrrell and his two sons, Timothy (Master of the Buckhounds to King Charles I) and William.

On 29 August 1624, King James knighted Tyrrell at Shotover while attending a sporting hunt. Tyrrell died in 1632.

References 

1570s births
1632 deaths
English knights
Masters of the Buckhounds
People from Aylesbury Vale
Knights Bachelor